Charles or Charlie Harris may refer to:

Arts and entertainment
 Charles K. Harris (1867–1930), American songwriter
 Charles Harris (photographer) (1908–1998), American photographer
 Charlie Harris (musician), American jazz double-bassist
 Charles Harris (painter), British painter, art instructor and teacher
 Charles "Dill" Baker Harris, character in the Harper Lee novel To Kill a Mockingbird

Military
 Charles L. Harris (general) (1834–1910), Union Army general
 Sir Charles Harris (civil servant) (1864–1943), civil servant in the British War Office
 Charles Harris (Royal Navy officer) (1887–1957), British admiral
 Charles A. "Bucky" Harris, crewman of patrol torpedo boat PT-109, commanded by then LTJG John F. Kennedy

Politics
 Charles M. Harris (1821–1896), U.S. Representative from Illinois
 Charles Coffin Harris (1822–1881), lawyer who became a politician and judge in the Kingdom of Hawaii
 Sir Charles Alexander Harris (1855–1947), Governor of Newfoundland
 Charles Oscar Harris, American public official and state legislator in Alabama
 Charles Edward Harris, 1892 U.S. Representative from Massachusetts

Science
 Charles B. Harris (1940–2020), American physical chemist at University of California, Berkeley
 Charles Boarman Harris (1857–1942), American physician and surgeon
 Charles Felix Harris (1900–1974), medical doctor and Vice Chancellor of London University

Sports
 Charlie Harris (third baseman) (1877–1963), American baseball third baseman
 Charles Harris (cricketer) (1907–1954), English cricketer
 Charles Harris (tennis) (1914–1993), American tennis player of the 1930s
 Charlie Harris (second baseman), Negro league baseball player
 Chuck Harris (born 1961), American football player
 Charles Harris (water polo) (born 1963), American water polo player
 Charles Harris (canoeist), American slalom canoeist
 Charles Harris (American football) (born 1995), American football player
 Charlie Harris (rugby league) (born 2003), rugby league player with the Bradford Bulls

Others
 Charles Harris (pirate) (1698–1723), English pirate
 Charles Wilson Harris (1771–1804), presiding professor of the University of North Carolina during 1796
 Charles Harris (bishop) (1813–1874), Bishop of Gibraltar in the Church of England
 Charles Hope Harris (1846–1915), surveyor in South Australia
 Charles F. Harris (1934–2015), African-American founder of Amistad Press
 Charles Bryan Harris, FBI Most Wanted Fugitive, 1965

See also 
 List of people with surname Harris